This is a list of newspapers published in New South Wales, Australia, in Languages other than English (LOTE). It reflects the many people who have migrated to this part of the world. According to the 2011 Census, 22.5% of the population speak a language other than English at home and 31.4% of the population were born overseas. More than 160 languages, as well as English, are spoken at home in Australia.

The Indigenous people are not listed because their community newspaper is in English, which may be due to the fact that different groups have different languages. Koori Mail (1991 to date) is the national fortnightly Indigenous newspaper.

Arabic

Bangla

Cambodian

Chinese

Croatian

Czech

Dutch

Estonian

Philippine languages

Finnish

French

German

Greek

Hindi

Hungarian

Indonesian

Italian

Japanese

Korean

Lithuanian

Maltese

Nepalese

Persian

Polish

Portuguese

Punjabi and Hindi

Russian

Serbian

Spanish

Tamil

Thai

Turkish

Ukrainian

Vietnamese

See also
 List of newspapers in Australia

References

Further reading

External links
 NSW Government Community Relations Commission – Ethnic Newspapers

New South Wales
New South Wales-related lists